The Internationales Hochsprung-Meeting is an annual high jumping competition which takes place in Eberstadt, Germany. Established as a men's competition in 1979, it quickly became an important meeting in the high jump calendar, with Jacek Wszoła setting a world record in 1980, and Zhu Jianhua improving the record further in 1984. A women's contest was added to the programme in 2002.

World record holder Javier Sotomayor remains the competition's most successful athlete, with a total of five wins achieved over seven years. Vyacheslav Voronin's and Stefan Holm's winning jumps in 2001 and 2004, respectively, were the greatest jumps in the world that season. Kajsa Bergqvist's winning jump in 2003 was also a season's best, and remains among the highest jumps ever completed by a female athlete.

Ariane Friedrich became the first German woman to win in Eberstadt in 2010 and Raúl Spank also made it the first German clean sweep that year.

A total of two world records, four European records, one Asian record and seventeen national records have been set at the competition.

Past winners

Key:

See also
Hochsprung mit Musik

References
General
Eberstadt – Das Mekka der Hochspringer . Hochsprung Eberstadt. Retrieved on 2009-11-21.
Specific

External links
 Official website  
 Competition summaries from IAAF: 2007, 2008, 2009



Recurring sporting events established in 1979
Annual track and field meetings
Athletics competitions in Germany
High jump competitions